Hamzeh Deh-e Sofla (also Romanized as Ḩamzeh Deh-e Soflá; also known as Ḩamzeh Deh-e Pā’īn) is a village in Baladeh Kojur Rural District, in the Central District of Nowshahr County, Mazandaran Province, Iran. At the 2006 census, its population was 525, in 125 families.

References 

Populated places in Nowshahr County